Hiraya Manawari is a Philippine children's television series. The educational television show was produced by ABS-CBN Foundation (formerly ABS-CBN Lingkod Kapamilya Foundation in cooperation with the Department of Education, Culture and Sports (DECS, now the Department of Education or DepEd) from 1995 to 2003.

Background
Hiraya Manawari focuses on providing values education for children through adaptation of Filipino stories and legends or original stories. The first episode of Hiraya Manawari, "Habi at Hiwaga" aired on October 7, 1995. Most episodes are family-centered and deals with courage, respect, honesty, love, humility and discipline.

Reruns 
On March 27, 2020, ABS-CBN announced that Hiraya Manawari will have a rerun starting from March 28, 2020, as part of ABS-CBN's temporary programming changes due to the COVID-19 pandemic.

References

1995 Philippine television series debuts
2003 Philippine television series endings
1990s Philippine television series
ABS-CBN original programming
Children's education television series
Filipino-language television shows
Philippine children's television series
Philippine educational television series